Shatiel Semyonovich Abramov (11 November 1918 - 14 May 2004) was a battalion commander in the Red Army during World War II who was awarded the title Hero of the Soviet Union.

Military career 
After completing training in an infantry school in 1940, he was drafted into the Soviet Army fighting in World War II. He was wounded six times during the war and awarded several military decorations and medals. Abramov was awarded the title of Hero of the Soviet Union for action in Poland after the death of his battalion commander whilst in combat. According to his citation, Abramov took command of the battalion during the fight for a fortress in Poznan, scaling a wall to gain entry, and leading the way to the conquest of the fortress by his battalion. Other activity attributed to him during the war includes walking from Stalingrad to Berlin, and commanding a battalion which killed 400 Germans and captured another 1500.

Postwar 
After war he graduated from the Geological Prospecting Faculty of the Grozny Petroleum Institute. in 1949 with a degree in Geology and mineralogy and then worked as senior laboratory assistant in the Grozny Oil Institute from 1949 until 1952. In 1952 he moved to study for a master's degree at the All-Union Geological Institute (Russian: Всесоюзний геологичесkий институт), in Leningrad, returning to the Grozny Petroleum Institute in 1956 as Dean of the Evening Faculty. In 1976 he was appointed as the Dean of the Faculty of Geological Exploration (декан геологического-разведочного факультета)

Abramov was the author of 10 scientific works, including one monograph. Abramov died in Moscow on 14 May 2004.

Awards and honors 

Hero of the Soviet Union
Order of Lenin
Order of the Red Banner
Order of the Red Star
Honored Scientist of Chechen-Ingush ASSR
Honorary Youth Mentor CHIASSR
Honorary Oilman of the USSR

References

External links 
 A Century of Ambivalence:The Jews of Russia and the Soviet Union, 1881 to the Present / Zvi Y. Gitelman

2004 deaths
Heroes of the Soviet Union
Recipients of the Order of the Red Banner
People from Derbentsky District
Soviet geologists
Mountain Jews
1918 births
Soviet military personnel of World War II